The site of  in Rikubetsu, Hokkaidō, Japan, is that once occupied by the Ainu chashi of Yukuepira, one of the largest on the island. It has been designated a National Historic Site.

Name
Yukuepira is derived from the Ainu yuk "deer", e "eat", and pira "cliff".

Overview
Skeletal remains from the fifteenth and sixteenth centuries of some ten thousand deer may be linked to trade in skins, and Yukuepira is understood to have functioned not only as a fort.

Investigation of the site from 2002 to 2004 has uncovered remains of a palisade, holes for posts, and a layer of ash. Artefacts of iron and bone have been recovered together with evidence for the diet, which included fish, nuts, and seeds. Earlier Jōmon and Zoku-Jōmon lithics and ceramics have also been found.

See also
 List of Historic Sites of Japan (Hokkaidō)
 List of Cultural Properties of Japan - archaeological materials (Hokkaidō)

References

External links
 Yukuepira Chashi 

Chashi
Historic Sites of Japan
Archaeological sites in Japan
Castles in Hokkaido